Donald Nelson Ziegler (born March 6, 1949) is an American politician in the state of Minnesota. He served in the Minnesota State Senate representing Blue Earth, Faribault, Martin, Waseca, and Watonwan Counties from 1999 to 2001, and was elected in a special election. Ziegler was elected on March 30 and sworn in on April 6, 1999.

References

1949 births
Living people
Minnesota state senators